St. Francis of Assisi Church refers to the English language spelling.
For churches with:
Spanish language titles, see Church of San Francisco (disambiguation)
Italian language titles, see Church of San Francesco (disambiguation) 
A list of English language titled churches includes:

Austria 
 St. Francis of Assisi Church, Vienna

Brazil 
 Church of Saint Francis of Assisi, Belo Horizonte
 Church of São Francisco de Assis, Ouro Preto

India 
 Church and Convent of St. Francis of Assisi, Goa
 Church of St. Francis of Assisi, Farangipet, Karnataka

Malta 
 Church of St Francis of Assisi, Ħamrun
 St Francis of Assisi Church, Valletta
 Church of St Francis, Victoria

Philippines 
 Parish Church of St. Francis of Assisi, Bulacan
 St. Francis of Assisi Parish Church (General Trias), Cavite
 Saint Francis of Assisi Parish Church, Quezon

Poland 
 St. Francis of Assisi's Church, Kraków

Singapore 
 Church of St. Francis of Assisi, Singapore

Slovakia 
 Church of Saint-Francis of Assisi, Hervartov

United Arab Emirates 
 St. Francis of Assisi Catholic Church, Jebel Ali, Dubai

United Kingdom 
 St Francis of Assisi's Church, Bournville, Birmingham, England
 St Francis of Assisi's Church, Handsworth, Birmingham, England
 St Francis of Assisi's Church, Cardiff, Wales

United States 
 Cathedral Basilica of St. Francis of Assisi, Santa Fe, New Mexico
 St. Francis of Assisi Cathedral (Metuchen, New Jersey)
 St. Francis of Assisi's Church (New York City)
 St. Francis of Assisi Catholic Church (Jefferson, North Carolina)
 St. Francis of Assisi Catholic Church (Wichita, Kansas)

Uruguay 
 Parroquia San Francisco de Asís, Montevideo

See also 
 Saint Francis of Assisi Cathedral (disambiguation)

The Caribbean 
 Saint Francis of Assisi Catholic Church(Cat Island, Bahamas)